Wing Commander Sir Ronald Dockray Waterhouse  (28 December 1878 – 28 November 1942) was a British Army, Royal Air Force officer and civil servant. During his career, he was private secretary to the Duke of York (later George VI), and to three prime ministers: Bonar Law, Stanley Baldwin, and Ramsay MacDonald.

Early life 
Ronald Waterhouse, the son of J.D. Waterhouse of Aigburth, Lancashire was educated at Marlborough College (Preshute) and Oxford. On leaving he joined the army and served in several campaigns across the world, including the Second Matabele War and the Second Boer War. He retired from the Army in 1910 and was granted a wound pension. He rejoined at the outbreak of the First World War and went on to be awarded the Mons Star.

Career 
After leaving 10 Downing St in February 1928 he took up a directorship with the Canadian General Investment Trust Ltd. He was a Fellow of the Royal Geographic Society.

He was awarded Order of the Bath (KCB) in the 1921 Birthday Honours list and Commander of the Royal Victorian Order (CVO) in the 1923 New Year Honours list.

Although aged 60, Waterhouse joined the Royal Air Force Volunteer Reserve to serve in the Second World War, achieving rank of Wing Commander.

Personal life 
His first wife Violet Goldingham died in June 1928 and he wasted no time, remarrying in secret at the Savoy Chapel in the Strand to Miss Nourah Chard, private secretary to Mrs Baldwin on 3 August 1928. She published a biography of her husband entitled Private and Official in 1942.

Waterhouse died on 28 November 1942 due to illness caused by war service and was cremated at Plymouth City Crematorium, Devon.

References 

 https://www.ukwhoswho.com/view/10.1093/ww/9780199540891.001.0001/ww-9780199540884-e-233166

  alongside Sir Patrick Gower

1878 births
1942 deaths
Principal Private Secretaries to the Prime Minister
Knights Commander of the Order of the Bath
Companions of the Order of St Michael and St George
Commanders of the Royal Victorian Order
People educated at Marlborough College
Alumni of the University of Oxford
British Army personnel of the Second Boer War
British Army personnel of World War I
Royal Air Force Volunteer Reserve personnel of World War II
Equerries
Royal Air Force personnel killed in World War II